Arthur M. Sarkissian is an Armenian-American film producer mainly known for being one of the producers of the Rush Hour series. He is also a former fashion designer based in England, UK, and the founder of a production company under his own name, Sarkissian Productions. He also served as a judge for the screenwriting competition called Script2Screens in 2020 that was focused on finding new and upcoming writers in the field.

Filmography

Films

Television

References

External links

Year of birth missing (living people)
Living people
American film producers